"Monkey Dory" is the fifth episode of the American superhero television series Peacemaker, a spin-off from the 2021 film The Suicide Squad. The episode was written by series creator James Gunn and directed by Rosemary Rodriguez. It originally aired on HBO Max on January 27, 2022.

The series is set after the events of The Suicide Squad, and follows Christopher Smith / Peacemaker. Smith returns to his home but is forced to work with A.R.G.U.S. agents on a classified operation only known as "Project Butterfly". Smith also has to deal with his personal demons, including feeling haunted by memories of people he killed for "peace", as well as reconnecting with his estranged father. In the episode, the police re-open Auggie's case as he claims he was framed by his own son. Meanwhile, the team prepares for an operation on a factory connected to the Butterflies.

The episode received generally positive reviews from critics, who praised the humor, action sequences and character development, although the pacing received some criticism.

Plot
Murn informs the team about the Butterflies, informing them that they infiltrate many humans to use them as hosts, including powerful people. Tensions arise between Smith and Economos, after the latter framed Auggie for Smith's crimes. Adebayo is told by Waller that she must place a diary in Smith's trailer home in order to frame him.

In prison, Auggie asks Detectives Song and Fitzgibbon to take his fingerprints again to prove that he wasn't at the crime scene. After confirming their veracity and questioning the building couple, they realize that Smith was responsible for the events at the building. Privately, Murn meets with an old associate, Caspar Locke for help. Locke infiltrates the police force as the new police captain and has Auggie's fingerprints linked to the crime scene, sending him back to prison. Despite Song's protests, Locke refuses to move with the case any further. Not giving up on the case, Song and Fitzgibbon ask Song's uncle, a Judge, for help in the case.

With Adebayo's new evidence linking the Butterflies to a bottling factory where the liquid is processed, the team raids the factory to kill the Butterflies. As the Butterflies overruns the team, the team is separated through the factory. During this, Harcourt and Chase are attacked by a Gorilla named Charlie, also revealed to be a Butterfly. Smith joins to fight it but is brutally beaten. Suddenly, Economos manages to kill Charlie with a chainsaw, which earns him Smith's respect. Following this, the team quickly bonds together.

With his newfound confidence, Smith invites Adebayo to join him at his trailer home. Adebayo advises him that he should be more considerate to other people in order to feel respected, including with Harcourt. While Smith is in the bathroom, Adebayo plants the diary in the house before leaving. She returns to the headquarters, finding Murn working at his desk. She decides to put on Smith's X-ray vision helmet, which allows her to see Murn and realizing that he is a Butterfly. She tries to escape but Murn catches up with her.

Production

Development
In July 2021, it was announced that Rosemary Rodriguez would direct an episode of the series.

Writing
During the beginning of the episode, while the team is preparing for their mission, Adrian Chase asks if the headquarters have cable television, as he wants to watch the series Fargo. Due to the inconsistency of the episode's air date, executive producer Peter Safran explained that inside the DC Extended Universe, "It's Fargos seventh season in the DCEU. Embrace the alternate reality."

Casting
In December 2020, Christopher Heyerdahl joined the series in the recurring role of Captain Locke.

Critical reception
"Monkey Dory" received generally positive reviews from critics. Samantha Nelson of IGN gave the episode a "great" 8 out of 10 rating and wrote in his verdict, "The Butterfly conspiracy continues unfolding in Peacemaker Episode 5, which delivers a satisfying mix of plot, character development, and mayhem. Considering that it effectively involves three interlocking stories spread across genres, it's an impressive testament to James Gunn's writing and vision that everything is fitting together in such a satisfying and funny way."

Jarrod Jones of The A.V. Club gave the episode a "B+" grade and wrote, "Peacemakers extermination of the alien horde is the first display of unrestrained havoc we've seen from the character since his pissing contest with Bloodsport in The Suicide Squad, but the real shock of 'Monkey Dory' is that the brutality of Chris' massacre is matched and then wildly exceeded by none other than Economos himself." Alec Bojalad of Den of Geek gave the episode a 3.5 star rating out of 5 and wrote, "Even in a relatively 'down' episode, Peacemaker is one hell of a TV series to experience. Apparently audiences agree as at least one analytic firm has pegged it as the streaming world's most-watched show. Hopefully those viewers appreciated learning that Superman has a poop fetish and Poison's preferred pronouns are 'long live rock' this week."

References

External links
 

Peacemaker (TV series) episodes
2022 American television episodes
Television episodes written by James Gunn